Georgina Montagu is a British journalist and author. In 2022, she published Top Dogs: A British Love Affair.

Montagu is the great-granddaughter of Nellie Ionides, who at her home in Sussex, Buxted Park, had kennels for more than 100 dogs, and ran a school for kennel maids.

She has lived in London, Tokyo, Paris and San Francisco, and worked for The Sunday Times Magazine and The World of Interiors, among others.

Top Dogs has a foreword from Camilla, Queen Consort (and pictures of her rescue terriers), and interviews with Andrew Lloyd Webber and the Duke of Richmond, along with photos of their dogs.

Motagu has two daughters, and lives in London.

Publications
Top Dogs: A British Love Affair, Triglyph, 2022

References

Living people
British non-fiction writers
British journalists
The Sunday Times people
Year of birth missing (living people)